Dyrnaesite-(La) is a rare-earth phosphate mineral with the formula . Dyrnaesite-(La) is related to vitusite-(Ce), another rare-earth phosphate mineral. It comes from lujavrite, a type of alkaline syenite rock, of South Greenland. Dyrnaesite-(La) is one of few known minerals with essential tetravalent cerium, the other two being cerianite-(Ce) and stetindite.

References

Phosphate minerals
Cerium minerals
Lanthanide minerals
Sodium minerals
Orthorhombic minerals
Minerals in space group 62